The Turunmaa-class fast gunboats (Finnish: Turunmaa-luokan tykkivene) was a type of vessel, previously operated by the Finnish Navy in the anti-submarine warfare (ASW) and trade protection roles. Internationally they were labeled as corvettes.

History
Development of the class started in 1963. Five hull designs and over thirty propulsion variants were looked at during development. At the time, the electronics of the vessels, and the  propulsion system were state of the art and attracted international attention. Both vessels were built by Wärtsilä's Hietalahti shipyard in Helsinki.

In 1985–86 both ships were refitted, and the entire fire-control and communications systems were updated. Karjala has been berthed since 2002 at the maritime museum Forum Marinum in Turku as a museum ship next to Suomen Joutsen. Turunmaa was stripped of armaments and served as a floating machine shop and training ship for Satakunta Polytechnics. Currently Turunmaa is being refitted for civilian use. Neither vessel is currently owned by the Finnish Navy.

The ships were ordered in 1963, launched in 1968, commissioned in 1969 and decommissioned in 2002. The lead vessel was named after the turuma frigates serving in the Archipelago Fleet in the 18th and 19th centuries.

Vessels of the class 
 Turunmaa (03)
 Karjala (04)

External links
 Finnish gunship FNS Turunmaa (1968) Photos (Flickr)
 Turun Sanomat newspaper archive
 The Finnish Navy's announcement of FNS Karjala's pending museum ship status
 MTV3.fi's news article from 2001
 Corvette Karjala @ Forum Marinum
 GN113 Warbird Consulting Ltd Current owner of Turunmaa. Includes pictures.

Ships built in Finland
Museum ships in Finland
Corvette classes
Cold War corvettes of Finland
Corvettes of the Finnish Navy
1968 ships